Agia (also written Ayia) is a village and a municipality in the Larissa regional unit, Thessaly, Greece. Agia is located east of Larissa and south of Melivoia. The Mavrovouni mountains dominate the south and the Aegean Sea lies to the east.

Municipality 
The municipality Agia was formed at the 2011 local government reform by the merger of the following 4 former municipalities, that became municipal units:
Agia 
Evrymenes 
Lakereia
Melivoia

The municipality Agia has an area of 661.79 km2, the municipal unit Agia has an area of 189.487 km2, and the community Agia has an area of 27.150 km2.

Subdivisions
The municipal unit of Agia is divided into the following communities:
Agia
Aetolofos
Anavra
Elafos
Gerakari
Megalovryso
Metaxochori
Neromyloi
Potamia

Province
The province of Agia was one of the provinces of the Larissa Prefecture. It had the same territory as the present municipality. It was abolished in 2006.

Population

History
Agia became part of Greece, along with most of Thessaly, in 1881. Forests near Agia were affected by the 2007 Greek forest fires, leaving tens homeless. The fire consumed approximately 100 km² on Mavrovouni.

See also
List of settlements in the Larissa regional unit

References

External links
 Agia (municipality) on GTP Travel Pages
 Agia (town) on GTP Travel Pages

Municipalities of Thessaly
Provinces of Greece
Populated places in Larissa (regional unit)